is a Japanese anime director and Nihonga artist. He is best known for his work as director of the Touch series, the movie adaptation of the Arashi no Yoru ni children's book series, and the movie Night on the Galactic Railroad. He is a member of the Directors Guild of Japan and the Japanese Animation Creators Association.

Works
Listed chronologically.

 Astro Boy (1963-1966, production, animation director, key animation)
 New Treasure Island (1965, animation director)
 Gokū no Daibōken (1967, supervising director)
 Dororo (1969, supervising director)
 Lupin III Pilot Film (1969, key animation)
 A Thousand and One Nights (1969, key animation)
 Kori no Kuni no Misuke (1970, production)
 Dobutsumura no Shoboshi (1972, production)
 Kanashimi no Belladonna (1973, animation director)
 Tasukeai no Rekishi -Seimei Hoken no Hajimari- (1973, production)
 Jack and the Beanstalk (1974, director)
 Manga Nippon Mukashi Banashi (1975-1994, episode director, script)
 Son Gokū Silk Road o Tobu!! (1982, character design, production coordination)
 Nine (1983, director)
 Nine 2: Sweetheart Declaration (1983, director)
 Glass Mask (1984, chief director)
 Nine 3: Final (1984, director)
 Night on the Galactic Railroad (1985, director)
 Touch (1985-1987, supervising director)
 Touch: Sebangō no Nai Ace (1986, director, script)
 Touch 2: Sayonara no Okurimono (1986, supervising director)
 The Tale of Genji (1987, director)
 Hiatari Ryōkō! (1987-1988, director)
 Touch 3: Kimi ga Tōri Sugita Ato ni (1987, supervising director, script)
 Hiatari Ryoko! Ka - su - mi: Yume no Naka ni Kimi ga Ita (1988, supervising director)
 Sweet Spot (1991, director, script)
 Nozomi Witches (1992-1993, director, script)
 Street Fighter II: The Animated Movie (1994, director)
 Soar High! Isami (1995-1996, supervising director)
 Street Fighter II V (1995, director)
 Lupin III: The Secret of Twilight Gemini (1996, director, screenplay)
 Touch: Miss Lonely Yesterday (1998, supervising director)
 Super Doll Licca-chan (1998-1999, director)
 Super Doll Licca-chan: Licca-chan Zettai Zetsumei! Doll Knights no Kiseki (1999, director)
 Hidamari no Ki (2000, director)
 Captain Tsubasa: Road to 2002 (2001, supervising director)
 Touch: Cross Road (2001, supervising director)
 Hajime no Ippo: The Fighting! (2001, 2nd opening animation storyboards)
 Toki Kono Chikyu (Hoshi) no Mirai o Mitsumete (2003, director)
 Lament of the Lamb (2003, director)
 Space Pirate Captain Herlock: The Endless Odyssey (2003, storyboards)
 Phoenix (2004, TV series, script, storyboards) 
 Arashi no Yoru Ni (2005, screenplay, director)
 Cinnamoroll: The Movie (2007, director)
 Tetsuko no Tabi (2007, opening animation storyboards)
 Tofu Kozo (2011, general director, screenplay)
 The Life of Guskou Budori (2012, director, writer, storyboards)
 Furusato meguri Nippon no Mukashibanashi (2017, supervisor)
 Rinshi!! Ekoda chan (2019, episode 2 director)

Books
 Street Fighter II Movie Storyboard Collection (STREET FIGHTER II MOVIE ストリートファイター II 絵コンテ集). Movic , 1994. 
 Anime to Seimei to Hourou to (アニメと生命と放浪と 「アトム」「タッチ」「銀河鉄道の夜」を流れる表現の系譜). Wani Books , 2012. 
 Night on the Galactic Railroad Setting Collection (アニメーション 「宮沢賢治 銀河鉄道の夜」設定資料集 増補新装版). Fukkan.com , 2018.

See also

References

External links
 
 
  Japan Movie Database
  Group TAC

1940 births
Anime directors
Japanese artists
Living people
People from Numazu, Shizuoka